David Michael Farrell, also known by his stage name Phoenix (born February 8, 1977), is an American musician, best known as the bassist of the rock band Linkin Park. He was also a member of Tasty Snax, a ska punk band.

Early life
He was born in Plymouth but later moved to Mission Viejo, California at the age of five. Farrell was taught how to play guitar by his mother when he was in high school. He also played the violin in high school. Farrell attended UCLA, where he was roommates with future bandmate Brad Delson. Farrell graduated from UCLA with a degree in philosophy.

Music career

Tasty Snax
While attending high school, Farrell joined a Christian ska punk band named Tasty Snax, who would later rename themselves to The Snax. Phoenix transitioned from the electric guitar to bass to accommodate The Snax. The band included Farrell's longtime college friend Mark Fiore, who was also associated in making of various video albums for Linkin Park. The band recorded two studio albums and one compilation album, signed to Screaming Giant Records. Farrell left the band in 2000.

Linkin Park

Farrell joined Xero, the earliest incarnation of Linkin Park, after meeting Brad Delson at UCLA. He contributed to the band's self-titled demo tape in 1997, but left the project to tour with Tasty Snax. Farrell's void was temporally filled by Delson, Ian Hornbeck and Scott Koziol, who all contributed to Hybrid Theory, Linkin Park's debut album. Farrell returned to Linkin Park in 2000 after a year-long absence.  
He served as the band's bassist for six of the band's seven studio albums. Along with Brad Delson and Rob Bourdon, Farrell also helped manage the band's business operations. 

Linkin Park went on a hiatus after Chester Bennington died in 2017.

Solo career
After Linkin Park went on a hiatus, Farrell expressed interest in creating a solo live show, where he would perform as a one-man band.

Personal life
Farrell is an avid golfer. He has a podcast with his best friend and professional golfer, Brendan Steele, and Mark Fiore, Linkin Park's videographer and video editor. He enjoys drinking coffee, beer, and wine.

Discography

With Linkin Park

 Reanimation (2002)
 Meteora (2003)
 Minutes to Midnight (2007)
 A Thousand Suns (2010)
 Living Things (2012)
 The Hunting Party (2014)
 One More Light (2017)

With Tasty Snax
 Run Joseph Run (1998) 
 Snax (2000)

References

External links
 Farrell's official LPN page

1977 births
Living people
American rock bass guitarists
American male bass guitarists
Linkin Park members
Musicians from California
People from Mission Viejo, California
Alternative metal bass guitarists
21st-century American bass guitarists
Grammy Award winners